Arcicella rosea  is a Gram-negative bacterium from the genus of Arcicella which has been isolated from tap water.

References

External links
Type strain of Arcicella rosea at BacDive -  the Bacterial Diversity Metadatabase

Further reading 
 

Cytophagia
Bacteria described in 2009